East Central High School is the sole high school of the Sunman-Dearborn Community School Corporation, located in St. Leon, Indiana, in the United States. The school serves students from the northern portion of Dearborn County.

History
The school was established in 1973 after a series of consolidative actions between Guilford, Sunman, Bright, and North Dearborn High Schools. These schools existed for varying lengths starting in the first decade of the millennium.

About
The school serves approximately 1300 students in grades 9-12, with a 21.8:1 student-to-teacher ratio, an approximately. equal balance of male and female students, and less than 3% non-White students.

The campus includes numerous classrooms and computer labs, a 1,500-seat Performing Arts Center, a field house, and comprehensive athletic facilities. Students in grades 9-12 are served by three guidance counselors and are assigned to counselors alphabetically by last name. Students in grades 11 and 12 are eligible to attend the Southeastern Career Center in order to pursue a career/technical program.

The curriculum offered by East Central High School includes 59 core curriculum classes, 90 elective classes, 62 career/technical courses, 15 Advanced Placement courses, and 15 dual credit courses for a total of 50 college credits. Students can earn dual college credits from Indiana University and IVY Tech College; participate and test with the College Board for AP courses, and earn workplace certifications in over 36 areas.

Over 80% of the graduates achieve an Academic Honors Diploma, Technical Honors Diploma, or Core 40 diploma. Additionally,  80% of the graduates pursue post-secondary education and training and 5% enlist in the military.

ECHS has over 50% of its students participating in one or more extracurricular activities. The facility offers over 35 extracurricular clubs.

Awards
18 Lilly Endowment Scholarship Winners
28 EIAC All-Sports Championships
1 WCPO Student of the Week
2 National FCCLA Officers
"A" Letter Grade, Indiana Department of Education, 2012-2016
 Top 1,900 Schools, The Washington Post, 2011

Athletics
Nearly one-third of the student body participates in one or more of the 20 varsity sports offered at ECHS. East Central is a member of the Eastern Indiana Athletic Conference (EIAC), and has won 28 all sports championships. Sports include football, soccer, cross country, tennis, basketball, swimming, wrestling, baseball, softball, track, golf, volleyball, and cheerleading.

East Central participates in the Eastern Indiana Athletic Conference. The school is the largest in the conference, participating at the 4A classification at all sports in the IHSAA. Due to its size and proximity to Interstate 74, the Trojans regularly compete against schools in the Cincinnati area.

Baseball (boys)
Basketball (girls & boys)
Cross country (girls & boys)
Football (boys)
State champion - 1994, 2017, 2022
Golf (girls & boys)
Soccer (girls & boys)
Softball (girls)
Swimming (girls & boys)
Tennis (girls & boys)
Track (girls & boys)
Volleyball (girls)
Wrestling (boys)

Notable alumni

Nick Goepper, Olympic skier
Jim Lyttle, Major League Baseball player

See also
 List of high schools in Indiana
 Eastern Indiana Athletic Conference
 St. Leon, Indiana

References

External links
 Official website

Public high schools in Indiana
Buildings and structures in Dearborn County, Indiana
1973 establishments in Indiana